The 77th Weapons Squadron is a United States Air Force unit assigned to the USAF Weapons School, stationed at Dyess Air Force Base, Texas.  The 77th is a Geographically Separated Unit of the 57th Wing, stationed at Nellis Air Force Base, Nevada. The mission of the squadron is to provide B-1 Lancer instructional flying.

The unit activated on 15 January 1941 at Fort Douglas, Utah. After combat operations in the Pacific theater during World War II, the 77th contributed to America's nuclear deterrent during the Cold War and formed the backbone of the Air Force's B-52 force during the Vietnam War.

Overview
The 77th provides weapons training to B-1B Lancer squadrons at Dyess Air Force Base, TX and Ellsworth AFB, SD.

History

World War II
The squadron was activated in January 1941 as a Northwest Air District medium bomber squadron, equipped with a mixture of Douglas B-18 Bolos, PT-17 Stearman trainers and early model Martin B-26 Marauders.   Upon completion of training, it was assigned to the new Elmendorf Field, near Anchorage, Alaska; being one of the first Air Corps units assigned to Alaska.  After the Japanese attack on Pearl Harbor, the squadron flew antisubmarine patrols over the Gulf of Alaska.

When the Japanese invaded the Aleutian Islands in June 1942, the squadron was reassigned to Fort Glenn Army Airfield on Adak Island; and began combat missions over the captured islands of Kiska and Attu.  Flew combat missions with B-26 Marauders and later B-25 Mitchell medium bombers during the Aleutian Campaign, remaining in Alaska until the end of World War II in 1945 when the squadron personnel were demobilized and the unit inactivated as a paper unit in early of November 1945.  SSgt Charlton Heston served as a radio operator and gunner aboard a B-25 of the 77th from 1944–45.

Cold War
Reactivated as a Strategic Air Command B-29 Superfortress squadron in 1946, being trained in the midwest then reassigned to Alaska in late 1946.  Mission changed from strategic bombardment training to strategic reconnaissance and mapping; engaging in very long range reconnaissance missions in the Bering Straits; North Pacific coast and Arctic Ocean coastline of the Soviet Union. Squadron performed charting and other mapping missions, most likely including ferret and ELINT missions, possibly overflying Soviet airspace.

Squadron returned to the Continental United States in 1947, being equipped with B-36 Peacemaker strategic bombers, both in the bomber and strategic reconnaissance versions.  Undertook strategic bombardment training missions on a global scale, including strategic reconnaissance missions with the RB-36s until the phaseout of the B-36 from SAC in 1957.

Re-equipped with B-52D Stratofortresses and stood nuclear alert and conducted global strategic bombardment training missions until 1966.  Began rotational deployments to Andersen AFB, Guam where squadron began flying conventional strategic bombardment Arc Light missions over Indochina (1966–1970).   Converted to B-52G in 1971 and returned to nuclear alert status; upgrading to B-52H in 1977.   Received first production B-1B Lancers in 1985 and maintained nuclear alert until taken off alert after the end of the Cold War in 1991.   Performed strategic bombardment training until inactivated in 1997 as part of the drawdown of the USAF.

Modern era
Organization organized as the USAF Weapons School B-1 Division on 28 August 1992 at Nellis Air Force Base, Nevada. Replaced by the 77th Weapons Squadron in 2003.  It provides training to B-1 aircrews at Dyess.

Lineage
 Constituted as the 77th Bombardment Squadron (Medium) on 20 November 1940
 Activated on 15 January 1941
 Redesignated 77th Bombardment Squadron, Medium on 9 October 1944
 Inactivated on 5 November 1945
 Redesignated 77th Bombardment Squadron, Very Heavy on 15 July 1946
 Activated on 4 August 1946
 Redesignated 77th Bombardment Squadron, Medium on 28 May 1948
 Redesignated 77th Bombardment Squadron, Heavy on 16 May 1949
 Redesignated 77th Strategic Reconnaissance Squadron, Photographic on 1 April 1950
 Redesignated 77th Strategic Reconnaissance Squadron, Heavy on 16 July 1950
 Redesignated 77th Bombardment Squadron, Heavy on 1 October 1955
 Redesignated 77th Bomb Squadron on 1 September 1991
 Inactivated on 31 March 1995
 Activated on 1 April 1997
 Inactivated on 19 September 2002
 Redesignated 77 Weapons Squadron on 24 January 2003
 Activated on 3 February 2003

Assignments
 42d Bombardment Group, 15 January 1941
 28th Composite Group (later 28 Bombardment Group), 2 January 1942
 Eleventh Air Force, 20 October – 5 November 1945
 28 Bombardment Group (later 28 Strategic Reconnaissance Group), 4 August 1946 (attached to 28th Strategic Reconnaissance Wing after 10 February 1951)
 28th Strategic Reconnaissance Wing (later 28 Bombardment Wing), 16 June 1952
 28th Operations Group, 1 September 1991 – 31 March 1995
 28th Operations Group, 1 April 1997 – 19 September 2002
 USAF Weapons School, 3 February 2003 – present

Stations

 Salt Lake City Army Air Base, Utah, 15 January 1941
 Gowen Field, Idaho, 4 June – 14 December 1941
 Elmendorf Field, Alaska, 29 December 1941
 Air echelon operated from Fort Glenn Army Air Field, Alaska beginning 30 May 1942
 Adak Army Air Field, Alaska Territory, 3 October 1942
 Air echelon operated from Adak Army Air Field, Alaska, beginning 12 December 1942
 Air echelon operated from Amchitka Army Air Field, Alaska, beginning 9 March 1943
 Air echelon operated from Attu Airfield, Alaska, beginning 10 July 1943

 Amchitka Army Airfield, Alaska, 11 September 1943
 Attu Airfield, Alaska, 11 February 1944 – 19 October 1945
 Fort Lawton, Washington, 29 October-5 November 1945
 Grand Island Army Air Field, Nebraska, 4 August-6 October 1946
 Elmendorf Field, Alaska, 20 October 1946 – 24 April 1947
 Rapid City Army Air Field (later Rapid City Air Force Base; Ellsworth Air Force Base), South Dakota, 17 April 1947 (air echelon), 3 May 1947 (ground echelon) – 31 March 1995
 Ellsworth Air Force Base, South Dakota, 1 April 1997 – 19 September 2002
 Dyess Air Force Base, Texas, 3 February 2003 – present

Aircraft

 Douglas B-18 Bolo, 1941, 1942–1943
 PT-17 Kaydet, 1941
 Martin B-26 Marauder, 1941–1943
 North American B-25 Mitchell, 1942–1945
 Boeing B-29 Superfortress, 1946–1950
 Boeing RB-29 Superfortress, 1946–1950
 Convair B-36 Peacemaker, 1949–1950; 1950–1957
 Convair RB-36 Peacemaker, 1949–1950; 1950–1957

 Boeing B-52 Stratofortress
 B-52D Stratofortress, 1957–1971
 B-52G Stratofortress, 1971–1977
 B-52H Stratofortress, 1977–1985
 B-1B Lancer, 1985–1995, 1997–2002, 2003 – present

See also

 List of B-52 Units of the United States Air Force

References
 Notes

 Citations

Bibliography

External links

Weapons 0077